Seiji Hibino (born 27 September 1950) is a Japanese archer. He competed in the men's individual event at the 1972 Summer Olympics.

References

1950 births
Living people
Japanese male archers
Olympic archers of Japan
Archers at the 1972 Summer Olympics
Place of birth missing (living people)